The 2012 Missouri Tigers football team represented the University of Missouri in the 2012 NCAA Division I FBS football season.  The team was coached for the 12th season by Gary Pinkel and played their home games at Faurot Field in Columbia, Missouri for the 87th consecutive season.  In their first season as a member of the Eastern Division of the Southeastern Conference, Missouri finished fifth with a record of 2–6 in the conference, and 5–7 overall.  As a result, the Tigers failed to qualify for a bowl game for the first time since the 2004 season.

Recruits
Key losses:
 OL John Birdwell
 TE Beau Brinkley
 OL Quinn Brown
 WR Terry Dennis
 DL Brendan Donaldson
 LB Will Ebner
 TE Michael Egnew
 WR Brandon Gerau
 LB Luke Lambert
 DL Dominique Hamilton
 DB Trey Hobson
 OL Dan Hoch
 WR Jerrell Jackson
 S  Kenji Jackson
 TE Andrew Jones
 WR Wes Kemp
 LB Tony Randolph
 DL Jacquies Smith

All nineteen recruits signed their National Letter of Intent during the National Signing Period (February 1, 2012 – April 1, 2012).

The recruits signed by February 1.

Almost one-third (six) of the nineteen recruits are from Missouri with three of them from St. Louis and one from Kansas City. Another six were from Texas.  
Markus Golden, a linebacker from Visalia, Texas, is the only junior college transfer. Darius White (the 20th), a wide receiver from Fort Worth, Texas is a transfer from the Texas Longhorns who has already enrolled in the off-season but has to sit out the 2012 season per NCAA transfer rules and will then have two years of eligibility starting in 2013.

Schedule

Schedule Source:

Coaching staff

Source: 2012 Mizzou Football Roster

David Yost resigned on December 3, suggestingly for personal reasons.

Roster

Games summaries

Tennessee

Rankings

References

Missouri
Missouri Tigers football seasons
Missouri Tigers football